The statue of the Duke of Devonshire is a Grade II-listed outdoor bronze sculpture of Spencer Cavendish, 8th Duke of Devonshire, the leader of three British political parties between 1875 and 1903, and is located at the entrance to Horse Guards Avenue, Whitehall, London, England. A work of the sculptor Herbert Hampton, it was unveiled in 1911.

The statue is around 4 metres high and rests on a plinth around 5 metres high. The inscription on the plinth gives the Duke's name, title, honours ( for Knight of the Garter; he is depicted wearing his Garter robes) and year of birth and death.

A committee headed by the Marquess of Lansdowne secured permission for the statue's location and the sculptor's design was approved by Edward VII in 1909 and completed the following year. The Marquess of Lansdowne unveiled the statue on 11 February 1911.

References

External links
 
Photograph of the Marquess of Landsdowne unveiling the statue in 1911.

1911 sculptures
Bronze sculptures in the United Kingdom
Devonshire
Grade II listed monuments and memorials
Monuments and memorials in London
Outdoor sculptures in London
Devonshire
Whitehall